Saul "Paul" de Groot (Amsterdam, 19 July 1899 – Bussum, 3 August 1986) was a Dutch politician of the Communist Party of the Netherlands (CPN). He was also a member of the House of Representatives for the CPN and chief editor of the party newspaper De Waarheid.

Biography
De Groot was the son of a Jewish diamond cutter in Amsterdam. He and his parents left for Antwerp in search of work. After primary school, De Groot jr. worked as an apprentice diamond cutter. When Antwerp was threatened by German troops after the outbreak of the First World War the De Groot family fled to the neutral Netherlands and temporarily settled in Amsterdam. Son Paul got a job with a cigar maker who taught him the principles of socialism. In 1916 he returned to Antwerp with his parents. De Groot jr. became a diamond worker and joined the General Diamond Workers' Union of Belgium (ADB) and the Socialist Young Watch.

Training
Impressed by the October Revolution (1917), he participated in the founding conference of the United Communist Party of Belgium and became a member of the party board. Because of his participation in the agitation against the (temporary) occupation of the Ruhr area, in which Belgian troops also participated, he had to flee Germany in October 1923. After a short stay in France, De Groot relocated to Amsterdam in the autumn of 1925. He was active in the General Dutch Diamond Workers' Union (ANDB) and in the Communist Party Holland (CPH), the predecessor of the Communist Party of the Netherlands (CPN).

Party board member
After a purge of political leadership enforced by Moscow, De Groot joined the party board of the CPN in February 1930. Because of his activist past, great readability (besides Karl Marx he also read Heinrich Heine), intelligence, journalistic qualities and tactical insight, he stood head and shoulders above his fellow directors. This and his almost slavish loyalty to Stalin led to De Groot becoming political secretary of the party in 1938, which had since been renamed Communist Party of the Netherlands. He formed the party presidency with Lou Jansen and Jan Dieters. He also became editor-in-chief of the newspaper Het Volksdagblad. He turned out to be a headstrong, often capricious and suspicious leader.

World War II
After the German invasion in May 1940, De Groot initially believed that the Hitler-Stalin Pact required a cautious attitude towards the German occupying forces. In the Volksdagblad he wrote that English imperialism and the Dutch bourgeoisie had provoked the occupation.

It did not prevent the CPN and its organs from being banned by the Germans. In November 1940, the first issue of a new, illegal party newspaper, De Waarheid, was published. De Groot aimed his arrows at the German aggressor, but also continued to fight "Anglo-American imperialism", the government in London and the SDAP. Only with the German attack on the Soviet Union in June 1941 did he change course. Incidentally, it was not De Groot, as the party legend later proposed, but fellow board member Jansen who wrote the famous manifesto 'Staak, staak, staak' on the eve of the February strike of 1941. The CPN has always considered this strike to be the culmination of the communist resistance against the Nazis in the Netherlands.

In October 1942, the Germans raided the house where De Groot and his family were hiding. De Groot managed to escape through the back door, but his wife and daughter were taken to Auschwitz and gassed there, which made him feel guilty and troubled the rest of his life. In February 1943 he again narrowly escaped arrest by the Germans. He then turned the party leadership over to others (including Jaap Brandenburg) and cut off all contact with the illegal party.

Recovery after 1945
After the war, De Groot succeeded in quickly and easily regaining power within the CPN. For a short time he promoted the dissolution of the party in favour of an 'Association of Friends of De Waarheid', because in that first post-war period the communist newspaper De Waarheid enjoyed wide popularity because of its resistance history. Fierce criticism in his own ranks and an ok from Moscow made De Groot decide in July 1945 to re-establish the CPN.

De Groot also entered the House of Representatives. There and in De Waarheid, of which he had become editor-in-chief, he sometimes defended contradictory views. For example, with regard to the young Indonesian republic: on the one hand he was against sending Dutch troops to violently crush the nationalist resistance in Java and elsewhere, on the other hand he thought that young communists should be sent out and then propaganda within the army for Indonesian independence. In their own communist circle this led to confusion and dissatisfaction.

End of board work
In 1962 De Groot stepped down as political secretary and was appointed party chairman. In 1966 he left the Chamber and a year later, at the 22nd party congress, he also resigned the presidency of the CPN. As an honorary member of the party board and director of the party's scientific office (IPSO), however, he continued to exercise decisive influence behind the scenes, such as in 1975 when the CPN decided to reconcile with Moscow.

When the party suffered a dramatic election defeat in 1977 - the CPN dropped from seven to two parliamentary seats - De Groot knows this because the party hierarchy had been fooled by 'government machinations' around the recently completed train hijacking at De Punt. He thought the current leadership was too soft - young academics and social workers had increasingly taken the place of workers as members and administrators in the 1970s - and wanted to see it replaced by steel worker frameworks. With that, however, he overplayed his hand. The party board opposed and stripped him of honorary membership (1978). De Groot's role had been played.

Retirement
For the last ten years of his life, he lived a secluded life. Journalists and others who tried to approach were rebuffed. De Groot moved with his (second) wife to a care flat in Zeist and after her death, in September 1985, to a Jewish nursing home in Bussum. The disappearance of the CPN group from the House of Representatives in 1986 never elicited any public comment from him. After his own death, that same year, Paul de Groot was commemorated with a single column in De Waarheid.

Literature
Cornelissen, I. (1996). Paul de Groot public enemy no. 1 . Amsterdam: Nijgh & Van Ditmar
Stutje, JW (2000). The man who showed the way. Life and work of Paul de Groot 1899-1986 . Amsterdam: Busy Bee ( digital edition )

References

External links

Official

  S. (Paul) de Groot Parlement & Politiek

 
 

 
 
 
 

1899 births
1986 deaths
Members of the House of Representatives (Netherlands)
Communist Party of the Netherlands politicians
Leaders of the Communist Party of the Netherlands
Chairmen of the Communist Party of the Netherlands
Jewish Dutch politicians
Jewish Dutch writers
Dutch Jews
Dutch journalists
Dutch newspaper editors
Dutch magazine editors
Resistance members from Amsterdam
Jewellers
Dutch Holocaust survivors
Dutch expatriates in Belgium
Dutch expatriates in Germany
Dutch expatriates in France
Writers from Amsterdam
Politicians from Antwerp
20th-century Dutch journalists